The Coleman A. Young Municipal Center is a government office building and courthouse located at 2 Woodward Avenue in Downtown Detroit, Michigan. Originally called the City-County Building, it was renamed for the former Detroit Mayor Coleman A. Young, shortly after his death in 1997. It serves as the City of Detroit government headquarters.

The Coleman A. Young Municipal Center houses offices, courtrooms, and meeting rooms. The class-A office building stands near the Renaissance Center, Hart Plaza, Ally Detroit Center, Courtyard by Marriott-Downtown Detroit, and the Millender Center.

Architecture

The modernist International-style building was designed by the architectural firm of Harley, Ellington and Day. Construction began on the skyscraper in 1951 and was completed in 1954. It is 20 floors tall, and including the basement has 21 total floors.

Three sides of the building's exterior are faced with white Vermont marble with black marble spandrel panels beneath the windows of the Courts Tower to emphasize the building's vertical lines.  The verticality of the tower section, with its white marble-clad piers and dark spandrels, offers a distinct contrast with the 14-story Administration Tower office section, in which horizontal lines are emphasized. The brick of the Randolph Street facade was not covered with marble to allow for a more economical future expansion.

Towers
Administration Tower

Courts Tower 
It contains office space on floors 1 through 8, and courtrooms, judges chambers, and jury rooms on floors 9 through 19, with the 20th floor housing the building's mechanical equipment.

Bas reliefs of the Detroit and Wayne County seals are carved in the wall, along with a quote from the Bible (2 Corinthians 3:17) Now the Lord is that Spirit: and where the Spirit of the Lord is, there is liberty.

Statue
As one of Detroit's most easily identifiable landmarks, a sketch of the statue appears as the central element of most of the logos of Detroit's city departments and services.

When Detroit sports teams (the Red Wings, Pistons and Tigers) have been in contention for their league's championship, the statue has traditionally been outfitted with a huge version of the appropriate team's jersey.

Skyway
An enclosed skyway over Randolph Street connects to the Millender Center, Courtyard by Marriott - Downtown Detroit, and the Renaissance Center as a sort of "enclosed city within a city". Entrance from the walkway to the third-floor level requires a security pass, and persons without a pass must return to the main floor entrance.

Operations
The Coleman A. Young Municipal Center is operated by the Detroit-Wayne Joint Building Authority, which was created in 1948 by the Michigan Legislature.  The building contains a library, a courthouse, and the city hall.

When it opened, the City-County Building replaced both the historic Detroit City Hall and Wayne County Building.  Many Wayne County offices have since moved to the nearby Guardian Building which now serves as the county's headquarters. The offices of the Wayne County Clerk remain in the building as does one division of the Wayne County (Third Judicial) Circuit Court, Circuit Court Administrative Offices and the Wayne County Probate Court.

On June 28, 2008, the Coleman A. Young Municipal Center was struck by lightning during a series of intense thunderstorms, and caused a transformer fire within the building.  It re-opened for service on July 9, 2008.  The smoke and fire damage was easily visible across the river in Windsor, Ontario.

References

External links

 
 

 

Skyscraper office buildings in Detroit
Young Municipal Center
Young Municipal Center
Young Municipal Center
Government buildings completed in 1954
International style architecture in Michigan
Modernist architecture in Michigan